The Million Pound Note  is a 1954 British comedy film directed by Ronald Neame and starring Gregory Peck, Ronald Squire, Wilfrid Hyde-White and Jane Griffiths. It is based on the 1893 Mark Twain short story The Million Pound Bank Note, and is a precursor to the 1983 film Trading Places. It was shot at Pinewood Studios and on location around London. The film's sets were designed by the art directors John Box and Jack Maxsted. It was released by Rank's General Film Distributors. The American release was handled by United Artists under the alternative tile Man with a Million.

Plot
In 1903, American seaman Henry Adams is stranded penniless in Britain and gets caught up in an unusual wager between two wealthy, eccentric brothers, Oliver and Roderick Montpelier. They persuade the Bank of England to issue a one million pound banknote, which they present to Adams in an envelope, only telling him that it contains some money. Oliver asserts that the mere existence of the note will enable the possessor to obtain whatever he needs, while Roderick insists that it would have to be spent for it to be of any use.

Once Adams gets over the shock of discovering how much the note is worth, he tries to return it to the brothers, but is told that they have left for a month. He then finds a letter in the envelope, explaining the wager and promising him a job if he can avoid spending the note for the month.

At first, everything goes as Oliver had predicted. Adams is mistaken for an eccentric millionaire and has no trouble getting food, clothes, and a hotel suite on credit, just by showing his note. The story of the note is reported in the newspapers. Adams is welcomed into exclusive social circles, meeting the American ambassador and English aristocracy. He becomes very friendly with Portia Lansdowne, the niece of the Duchess of Cromarty. Then fellow American Lloyd Hastings asks him to back a business venture. Hastings tells Adams that he does not have to put up any money himself; the mere association will allow Hastings to raise the money that he needs to develop his gold mine by selling shares.

Trouble arises when the Duke of Frognal, who had been unceremoniously evicted from the suite Adams now occupies, hides the note as a joke. When Adams is unable to produce the note, panic breaks out amongst the shareholders and Adams's creditors. All is straightened out in the end, and Adams is able to return the note to the Montpelier brothers at the end of the month.

Cast

Gregory Peck as Henry Adams
Ronald Squire as Oliver Montpelier
Wilfrid Hyde-White as Roderick Montpelier
Jane Griffiths as Portia Lansdowne
Joyce Grenfell as Duchess of Cromarty
A. E. Matthews as Duke of Frognal
Maurice Denham as Mr. Reid
Reginald Beckwith as Rock
Brian Oulton as Lloyd
John Slater as Parsons
Wilbur Evans as American ambassador
Hartley Power as Hastings
George Devine as restaurant proprietor
Bryan Forbes as Todd
Gudrun Ure as Renie 
Hugh Wakefield as Duke of Cromarty
 Ronald Adam a 	Samuel Clemens 
Felix Felton as Alfred 
 Richard Caldicot as James, the Butler 
Hugh Griffith as Potter 
 Ann Lancaster as 	Doris
Laurence Naismith as Walter Craddock
 Gibb McLaughlin as Sir William Collinge
Ernest Thesiger as	Mr. Garrett
 Percy Marmont as Lord Hurlingham 
Joan Hickson as Maggie 
 Harold Goodwin as Horace 
 Henryetta Edwards as 	Lady Jane 
 Winifred Evans as Lady Hurlingham 
 Jack McNaughton as 	Williams
 Hal Osmond as Arthur 
 Mae Bacon as 	Alfred's Wife 
 Peggy Ann Clifford as 	Assistant Matron 
 Fanny Carby as Nursemaid at Belgrave Square 
 Eliot Makeham as Consulate Official 
 Hugh Latimer as Hotel Receptionist
 Roddy Hughes as 	Clergyman 
 Totti Truman Taylor as 	Singer
 Leonard Sharp as Cabbie 
 Willoughby Goddard as 	Stockbroker

Production
The novel had been adapted for British TV in 1950 by Rex Rienits. Producer Daniel Angel bought the film rights to the adaptation.

Reception
In the 21st century, Hal Erickson described it as "satisfying", with humor that makes the audience's laughter cascade.

References

External links 

1954 films
1954 comedy-drama films
British comedy-drama films
British historical films
1950s historical films
Films scored by William Alwyn
Films about brothers
Films about poverty in the United Kingdom
Films based on short fiction
Films based on works by Mark Twain
Films directed by Ronald Neame
Films produced by Ronald Neame
Films set in 1903
Films shot in London
Films set in London
Films shot at Pinewood Studios
Films about gambling
United Artists films
1950s English-language films
1950s British films